Mexico participated in the 2010 Summer Youth Olympics in Singapore.

The Mexico team included 42 athletes competing in 16 sports.

Medalists

Archery

Boys

Girls

Mixed Team

Athletics

Boys
Track and Road Events

Field Events

Girls
Track and Road Events

Field Events

Badminton

Boys

Girls

Boxing

Boys

Canoeing

Boys

Cycling

Cross Country

Time Trial

BMX

Road Race

Overall

 * Received -5 for finishing road race with all three racers

Diving

Boys

Girls

Gymnastics

Artistic Gymnastics

Boys

Girls

Rhythmic Gymnastics 

Individual

Judo

Individual

Team

Modern pentathlon

Sailing

Windsurfing

Shooting

Pistol

Rifle

Swimming

Taekwondo

Triathlon

Girls

Men's

Mixed

Weightlifting

Wrestling

Greco-Roman

References

External links
Competitors List: Mexico

Oly
Nations at the 2010 Summer Youth Olympics
Mexico at the Youth Olympics